Wrzosowo  is a village in the administrative district of Gmina Dygowo, within Kołobrzeg County, West Pomeranian Voivodeship, in north-western Poland. 

References

Villages in Kołobrzeg County